Arthur Edwards may refer to:
Arthur Edwards (antiquary) (died 1743), English army officer and antiquary
Arthur Edwards (basketball) (born 1992) American basketball player
Arthur Edwards (clergyman) (1834–1901), American clergyman and editor
Arthur Edwards (footballer, born 1915) (1915–2002), Australian rules footballer
Arthur Edwards (footballer, born 1934) (1934–2006), Australian rules footballer
Arthur Edwards (photographer) (born 1940), British photographer
Arthur Edwards (sailor) (flourished 1560s), British sailor
Arthur Charles Edwards (1867–1940), English organist and composer
Arthur Noel Edwards (1883–1915), English polo player

See also
Tudor Edwards (1890–1946, Arthur Tudor Edwards), Welsh thoracic surgeon

Edwards (surname)